Scirpus bicolor is a species of plant in the sedge family, Cyperaceae. The plant is endemic to Tristan da Cunha, Nightingale Island, Inaccessible Island and Gough Island. Its natural habitats are subantarctic forests, subantarctic shrubland, and swamps.

References

 Ryan, P. 2007. Field Guide to the Animals and Plants of Tristan da Cunha and Gough Island.

bicolor
Flora of Gough Island
Least concern plants
Plants described in 1819
Taxonomy articles created by Polbot